James Atherton (born 1987) is an English actor.

James Atherton may also refer to:

 James Atherton (early settler to Massachusetts) ( 1624–1710), emigrated to the New England Colonies in 1635
 James Atherton (died 1879) (1819–1879), 19th century Massachusetts businessman
 James Atherton (footballer, born 1872) (1872 – after 1895), English footballer
 James Atherton (footballer, born 1875) (1875–1923), English footballer
 James Atherton (photographer) (1927–2011), American news photographer
 James Atherton (tenor) (1943–1987), American tenor and Artistic Director
 Jim Atherton (James Geoffrey Atherton, 1923–2010), Welsh professional footballer